Davinson Sánchez Mina (born 12 June 1996) is a Colombian professional footballer who plays as a centre-back for  club Tottenham Hotspur and the Colombia national team.

Despite initially coming through América de Cali's youth academy, Sánchez relocated to Medellín and made his professional debut for Atlético Nacional in 2013; collectively, he acheieved four domestic league titles, two Copa Colombia's, a Superliga Colombiana, and a Copa Libertadores during his time with Nacional. Sánchez made the leap to European football in 2016, joining Eredivisie side AFC Ajax. In his first season with the club, he won the Ajax Player of the Year Award and reached the 2017 UEFA Europa League Final. Sánchez became Tottenham Hotspur's club-record signing in 2017, costing them around £42 million, a record that was topped by Tanguy Ndombélé who signed for Spurs in 2019.

At youth level, Sánchez represented Colombia at the 2013 South American U-17 Championship and was part of the Colombia squads that participated at the 2015 South American U-20 Championship and the 2015 FIFA U-20 World Cup, respectively. He made his senior debut for Colombia in 2016 and has represented the nation at two editions of the Copa América, and the 2018 FIFA World Cup.

Club career

Atlético Nacional
As a youth, Sánchez played in the youth academy of América de Cali, but after his parents moved, he was transferred to Atlético Nacional, where he was educated under the wings of Juan Carlos Osorio. The defender made his debut for the senior team on 27 October 2013, in a 0–1 loss to Boyacá Chicó. Osorio put the player in the starting lineup and he completed the entire match.

On 2 March 2016, Sánchez scored his first goal for Nacional in a 3–0 victory over Sporting Cristal from Peru in the Copa Libertadores. Due to his performances for Nacional, foreign clubs including Barcelona, Flamengo, and Ajax showed an interest in signing the player. Barcelona made a formal offer to sign the player, but Sánchez declined the offer because he didn't want to start in FC Barcelona B, the reserve team. He won the Copa Libertadores 2016 against Ecuadorian Independiente del Valle.

Ajax
In June 2016, Sánchez signed a five-year contract with Dutch side Ajax, until 2021. The club paid a transfer fee of €5 million to Atlético Nacional. A few days earlier, Ajax had signed Sánchez's compatriot Mateo Cassierra, thus making him the second Colombian in the squad. Sánchez joined Ajax after Nacional had finished its participation in the Copa Libertadores. Sánchez's Ajax debut on 13 August ended in a 2–2 tie with Roda JC Kerkrade in which he started and played the 90 minutes. His first goal with the club was on 24 September against PEC Zwolle. On 8 May 2017, he was named as the best player of the season for Ajax.

Tottenham Hotspur
On 18 August 2017, Premier League club Tottenham Hotspur announced that they had agreed a move for Sánchez signing a six-year contract subject to a work permit, for a reported transfer fee of up to £42 million. He made his debut on 27 August as a substitute for Mousa Dembélé in the 92nd minute in a 1–1 draw with Burnley.

On 15 May 2018, Sánchez signed a new contract with Tottenham, keeping him at the club until 2024.

On 10 February 2019, Sánchez scored his first goal for Tottenham in the Premier League game against Leicester City.

On 1 June 2019, Sánchez was an unused substitute for Tottenham in the 2019 Champions League Final against Liverpool.

On 11 February 2021, Sánchez scored twice, his first goals in two years, in the 2020–21 FA Cup fifth round match against Everton that eventually ended in a 5–4 loss for Tottenham after extra time.

International career

Youth teams
In November 2011, Sánchez was called up to dispute the 2011 South American U-15 Championship, where his team finished as runner-up behind Brazil; Sánchez was appointed as his team's captain for the tournament.

Sánchez represented Colombia U-17 side at the 2013 South American U-17 Championship, where he appeared twice in the group stage.

On 6 January 2015, he was included in Carlos Restrepo's 23-man list for the 2015 South American U-20 Championship, where Colombia secured qualification to the 2015 FIFA U-20 World Cup and the Olympic play-off for Rio 2016 after finishing runner-up. On 6 May, Sánchez was named in Colombia final 23-man team for the U-20 World Cup, where his team exited the tournament in the round of 16 after falling to the United States.

Despite not disputing the Olympics, Sánchez appeared in both legs for the play-off series against the United States, in which Colombia qualified to the Olympics for the first team since Barcelona 1992 after finishing the series 3–2 on aggregate.

Senior team
Colombia manager José Pékerman called up Sánchez for a training squad with the senior Colombia squad in February 2016. On 26 August 2022, he was named in Colombia's squad for the 2018 World Cup qualifiers against Venezuela and Brazil. On 19 November, Sánchez made his debut against Argentina.

In May 2018, he was named in Colombia's preliminary 35-man squad for the 2018 FIFA World Cup in Russia. In June 2018, he was named in Colombia's final 23-man squad for the 2018 FIFA World Cup in Russia. He played in all three group matches and their round of 16 match against England.

In June 2019, he started in three of the four games at the 2019 Copa América, helped the team keep a clean sheet and beat Argentina for the first time in 12 years.  The team however lost in the quarter-final against Chile after a penalty shoot-out.

On 10 June 2021, Sánchez was included in Reinaldo Rueda's 23-man squad for the 2021 Copa América in Brazil. He featured in all of Colombia's matches as the team secured bronze after defeating Peru 3–2 for the third-place playoff.

On 19 November 2022, Sánchez scored his first international goal in a 2–0 friendly win against Paraguay.

Career statistics

Club

International

Scores and results list Colombia'a goal tally first, score column indicates score after each Sánchez goal.

Honours
Atlético Nacional
Categoría Primera A: 2013 Apertura, 2013 Finalización, 2014 Apertura, 2015 Finalización
Copa Colombia: 2012, 2013
Superliga Colombiana: 2016; runner-up: 2014, 2015
Copa Libertadores: 2016
Copa Sudamericana runner-up: 2016

Ajax
UEFA Europa League runner-up: 2016–17

Tottenham Hotspur
EFL Cup runner-up: 2020–21
UEFA Champions League runner-up: 2018–19

Colombia U23
CONCACAF–CONMEBOL play-off for the 2016 Summer Olympics: 2016

Individual
Ajax Player of the Year (Rinus Michels Award): 2016–17
UEFA Champions League Breakthrough XI: 2017

References

External links

Profile at the Tottenham Hotspur F.C. website

1996 births
Living people
Colombian people of African descent
Sportspeople from Cauca Department
Colombian footballers
Association football defenders
Atlético Nacional footballers
AFC Ajax players
Jong Ajax players
Tottenham Hotspur F.C. players
Categoría Primera A players
Eredivisie players
Eerste Divisie players
Premier League players
Colombia youth international footballers
Colombia under-20 international footballers
Colombia international footballers
2018 FIFA World Cup players
2019 Copa América players
2021 Copa América players
Colombian expatriate footballers
Expatriate footballers in the Netherlands
Expatriate footballers in England
Colombian expatriate sportspeople in the Netherlands
Colombian expatriate sportspeople in England